Malli Pelli is a 1939 Indian Telugu-language social drama film directed by Y. V. Rao. The film swayed the imagination of the social reformers of the day, such as Ram Mohan Roy and Kandukuri Veeresalingam.

Plot 
Janardhana Rao Panthulu (Balijepalli) is a lawyer. He was a fundamentalist who valued commitments to orthodox rituals. He marries his six-year-old daughter Lalita (Kanchanamala) to an old man and dies shortly after. The result is that Lalit becomes a widow at an early age. Elegant grows between serious commitments.

A Swami named Kaliyuganandaswamy enters the house and Janardhana Rao enters the house. The name of the master was spread all over the place. All the people flocked to see him, believing that it was heaven to eat their Tirthaprasadas. The masters make Janarthana Rao a puppet in his hand and wield power over him.

One day someone came to call me by name and unknowingly put a blob on Lalit's face. The blob masters look on and shout that the Kallerra Jesse religion has been desecrated. All the salesmen speak Nana. Lalit is in desperate grief.

She is introduced to a social reformer named Sundara Rao (Y. V. Rao). He persuades her and frees her from the old commitments and remarries.

Cast 

 Y. V. Rao as Social reformer Sundara Rao
 Kanchanamala as Lalitha
 Balijepalli Lakshmikantham Kavi as Janardhana Rao Panthulu
 Bejawada Rajaratnam as Kamala
 Koccharlakota Satyanarayana as Venkata Rao
 Krishnaveni as Annapoorna
 Rangaswamy as Kaliyugananda Swamy
 Natesayya as Aparala Ananthayya
 Manikyamma as Venkamma
 Narayanayya as CID Inspector
 Rajalakshmamma as Subbamma
 Srinivas as Ramajogi
 Suryanarayana as Sapindi Sankarayya
 Kasi Chenchu as Sabhapati
 Ramachandra Murthy as Ramudu
 Rajaratnam as Kamala/Subhadramma
 Krishnavenamma as Annapurnamma
 Naga Lakshmi as Naamcharamma

Music 
The soundtrack of the film is composed by V. Ramachandra Rao and lyrics were written by Balijepalli Lakshmikantham Kavi. The following are the songs in the film:

 "Aanadamega Vaanchhaneeyamu"
 "Cheli Kumkumame Paavaname"
 "Koyilaro Edi Ni Prema Geethi"
 "Na Sundara Surachira Rupa"
 "Gopalude Ma Gopalude"

References

External links 

 

1939 films
Indian films based on actual events
Films about social issues in India
Indian drama films
1930s Telugu-language films
Indian black-and-white films
Films directed by Y. V. Rao
Films scored by V. Ramachandra Rao